Peperomia persulcata is a species of plant in the family Piperaceae. It is endemic to Ecuador.

References

Flora of Ecuador
persulcata
Vulnerable plants
Taxonomy articles created by Polbot